Janar Toomet (born 10 August 1989) is a retired Estonian professional footballer who played as a midfielder.

Club career

Flora
Toomet began playing football at Flora youth academy. He made his senior league debut in the Esiliiga for the club's reserve side, Flora II, on 11 March 2006, in a 0–2 home loss to Nõmme Kalju. Unable to break into the Flora's first team, Toomet spent time on loan at Warrior and Tulevik. He made his debut in the Meistriliiga on 4 April 2009, in a 1–1 draw against Narva Trans.

Levadia
In 2011, Toomet signed for Levadia. He won the 2011–12 Estonian Cup.

Nõmme Kalju
On 24 February 2013, Toomet signed a three-year contract with Nõmme Kalju.

Sillamäe Kalev
On 20 February 2015, Toomet signed for Sillamäe Kalev.

Paide Linnameeskond
On 1 March 2016, Toomet joined Paide Linnameeskond.

Return to Nõmme Kalju
On 21 July 2016, Toomet returned to Nõmme Kalju, signing a contract until the end of the season. On 6 December 2016, he signed a contract extension keeping him at the club until 2017.

International career
Toomet began his youth career in 2007. He represented the under-19, under-21, and under-23 national sides, making nine youth appearances overall.

Toomet made his debut for the senior national team on 19 November 2016, in a 1–1 away draw against Saint Kitts and Nevis in a friendly.

Honours

Club
Levadia
Estonian Cup: 2011–12

References

External links

1989 births
Living people
Footballers from Tallinn
Estonian footballers
Association football midfielders
Esiliiga players
FC Flora players
FC Warrior Valga players
Meistriliiga players
Viljandi JK Tulevik players
FCI Levadia Tallinn players
Nõmme Kalju FC players
JK Sillamäe Kalev players
Paide Linnameeskond players
Estonia youth international footballers
Estonia under-21 international footballers
Estonia international footballers
FCI Levadia U21 players